A solar rickshaw is a vehicle, usually three-wheeled, driven by an electric motor and powered either by solar panels or by a battery charged by solar panels.

A solar rickshaw may be a type of:
 Cycle rickshaw, if it is equipped with both pedals and an assisting electric motor
 Electric rickshaw, if its only means of propulsion is one or more electric motors

See also
 Rickshaw (disambiguation)
 Solar vehicle
 Zero-emissions vehicle